, German leisure airline Condor operates year-round and seasonal scheduled flights to the following destinations:

Destinations

References

Condor Flugdienst